Robert Edwards Chakales [sha-kuh'-les] (August 10, 1927 – February 18, 2010) was a pitcher in Major League Baseball who played with four clubs between the 1951 and 1957 seasons. Listed at 6'1", 185 lb., Chakales batted and threw right-handed. He was born in Asheville, North Carolina.

Originally a starter, Chakales also filled various roles coming out from the bullpen, as a closer or middle reliever. He reached the majors in 1951 with the Cleveland Indians, spending three and a half years with them before moving to the Baltimore Orioles (1954), Chicago White Sox (1955), Washington Senators (1955–57) and Boston Red Sox (1957).

In his rookie year Chakales recorded two of his three wins helping himself with the bat, going 7–for–20 (.350) with one home run and six RBI. His most productive season came in 1954, when he posted career highs in wins (5), strikeouts (47), earned run average (3.43) and innings pitched (99.2) in 41 pitching appearances (six as a starter). After that, he was part of various trades that included players as Vic Wertz, Don Ferrarese, Clint Courtney, Johnny Groth, Jim Busby, Milt Bolling and Faye Throneberry.

In a seven-season career, Chakales went 15–25 with 187 strikeouts and a 4.54 ERA in 171 games, including 23 starts, three complete games, one shutout, 10 saves, and 225 walks in  innings of work. As a hitter, he posted a .271 average (26–for–96) with one home run and 9 RBI.

Chakales died in Richmond, Virginia, at the age of 82.

Sources

Retrosheet - player page

1927 births
2010 deaths
American people of Greek descent
Baltimore Orioles players
Baseball players from North Carolina
Boston Red Sox players
Chicago White Sox players
Cleveland Indians players
Hawaii Islanders players
Indianapolis Indians players
Major League Baseball pitchers
Minneapolis Millers (baseball) players
Oklahoma City Indians players
Portland (NEL) baseball players
Richmond Virginians (minor league) players
San Francisco Seals (baseball) players
Toronto Maple Leafs (International League) players
Utica Blue Sox players
Wilkes-Barre Indians players
Wilmington Blue Rocks (1940–1952) players
Sportspeople from Asheville, North Carolina